The Qanats of Baladeh Ferdows belongs to the Sasanian Empire and is located in Ferdows.

References 

Persian developed underground aqueducts
Water wells
Infrastructure in Iran
World Heritage Sites in Iran
Buildings and structures in South Khorasan Province